Balagny-sur-Thérain (literally Balagny on Thérain) is a commune in the Oise department in northern France. Balagny-Saint-Épin station has rail connections to Beauvais and Creil.

Population

See also
Communes of the Oise department

References

Communes of Oise